Al-Shiha is a Syrian village located in the Masyaf Subdistrict in Masyaf District, located west of Hama. According to the Syria Central Bureau of Statistics (CBS), al-Shiha had a population of 1,101 in the 2004 census.

References 

Populated places in Masyaf District